Chorithrips is a genus of thrips in the family Phlaeothripidae.

Species
 Chorithrips heptatoma
 Chorithrips octotoma

References

Phlaeothripidae
Thrips
Thrips genera